The Andreafsky River (Yup'ik: Negeqliq) is a  tributary of the Yukon River in the U.S. state of Alaska. The Andreafsky flows south from near Iprugalet Mountain in the Yukon Delta National Wildlife Refuge to meet the larger river at Pitkas Point, near the village of St. Mary's.

In 1980, the Andreafsky and the East Fork Andreafsky rivers became part of the National Wild and Scenic Rivers System. The designation covers about 265 river miles (RM) or 426 river kilometers (RK) along the two streams and their headwaters. About 198 RM (319 RK) of these flow through the Yukon Delta Wilderness; 54 RM (87 RK) cross private lands, and 13 RM (21 RK) flow through a wild-river corridor within non-wilderness refuge lands.

Flora and fauna
Black spruce and white spruce, balsam poplar, and large bogs dominate the land near the rivers, while willow shrubs, mosses, lichens, and other vegetation grows on the tundra at higher elevations in the watershed.

Wildlife includes foxes, beavers, bald eagles, golden eagles, falcons, hawks, owls, geese, and large populations of brown bears. Bristle-thighed curlews have one of their main nesting grounds in the upstream (Nulato Hills) portion of the wilderness. Grayling, salmon, and Dolly Varden trout are found in both rivers.

Boating
Both rivers are rated Class I (easy) on the International Scale of River Difficulty. The put-in places on the upper rivers are remote and difficult to reach, either by hired boat out of St. Mary's or an air taxi that can land on gravel bars. Dangers include bears.

Neither river is ice-free until June 1 or later. Water levels fluctuate after that: high in June, low in July, high again by mid-August, and usually floatable throughout September.

See also
List of National Wild and Scenic Rivers
List of rivers of Alaska

References

Rivers of Nome Census Area, Alaska
Rivers of Alaska
Rivers of Kusilvak Census Area, Alaska
Wild and Scenic Rivers of the United States
Tributaries of the Yukon River
Rivers of Unorganized Borough, Alaska